Hutnik Warszawa, known in English as Hutnik Warsaw, is a Polish professional football club based in the Bielany district of Warsaw, Poland. It was founded on April 21, 1957 as Hutniczy Klub Sportowy (Steelworkers' Sports Club) and renamed Bielański Klub Sportowy (Bielany Sports Club) in 2001.

History
Hutnik has never played in the top division, and the highest position it has achieved in the Polish First League was 6th (1992/93). The successes in the Polish Cup include reaching the quarterfinal in 1991, as well as winning the Cup on a regional level on June 4, 2008 (after defeating Legia Warszawa reserves 1:0 in the final).

Despite not being the most successful of clubs in terms of trophy-winning, Hutnik has always been particularly active in developing young, mostly local, players; several former Hutnik players even went on to play for the Polish national team. Michał Żewłakow, previous captain of the national team, is a former Hutnik player.

Hutnik was traditionally sponsored by the nearby steel mill (Huta Warszawa) and the privatisation of that steelworks – and thus the ending of the sponsorship – marked the beginning of the club's steady decline. In the summer of 2012 Hutnik's disastrous financial condition finally resulted in dissolution of the club but the club was re-formed starting from the bottom of the league pyramid (8th level, known as B-Klasa).

Former managers

Trivia: three of the former Hutnik managers (Strejlau, Wójcik and Engel) went on to manage the Polish National team, and another one (Zamilski) is currently managing the Polish U-21 team.

Records
Biggest win: 22:0 against WKS II Rząśnik (2012/13 season)
Biggest defeat: 0:8 against Warmia Grajewo (2002/03 season)
Highest league position: 6th in the Second Division (1992/93 season)
Lowest league position: 8th in the Polish Fifth League (2004/05 season)
Most games for the club: Mariusz Szymaniak: 302 (1997–2009, 2012–)
Most goals for the club: Mariusz Szymaniak: 120

External links
 Official website 
 Hutnik profile in 90minut.pl 

Football clubs in Warsaw
Multi-sport clubs in Poland
Association football clubs established in 1957
1957 establishments in Poland